is a railway station in Kikonai, Hokkaido, Japan, operated by Hokkaido Railway Company (JR Hokkaido) and South Hokkaido Railway Company.

Lines
Kikonai Station is served by the following lines.
South Hokkaido Railway Line
Kaikyō Line (freight only)
Hokkaido Shinkansen

Station layout
The station has one ground-level island platform for the South Hokkaido Railway and two elevated side platforms for the Hokkaido Shinkansen.

Platforms

Adjacent stations

History 
The station opened on the Esashi Line on October 25, 1930. Between October 12, 1937 and March 31, 1988, it was the terminus of the Matsumae Line. It became the terminus of the Kaikyō Line on March 13, 1988. On March 26, 2016, the Hokkaido Shinkansen platforms opened for passenger service.

Surrounding area 
Kikonai Post office

See also
 List of railway stations in Japan

References 

Railway stations in Hokkaido Prefecture
Tsugaru-Kaikyō Line
Hokkaido Shinkansen
Railway stations in Japan opened in 1930
Kikonai, Hokkaido